Pieter Gaal (19 July 1769 in Middelburg – 13/18 January 1819 in Middelburg) was a Dutch painter, the son of Thomas Gaal.
Gaal came from a family of painters from the Zeeland area of the Netherlands, his earliest ancestor was a knight called Florens Ghale van Hoesbroec, though his father was born in what is now Belgium. His son Jacobus Cornelis Gaal was also a painter, painting portraits such as "Junges Madchen in Weissen Kleid Beim Einkleid" a portrait of a young woman being dressed by a maidservant.
Gaal's main focus were "landscapes with cattle and figures furnished, a hobby portraits, living and dead game and genre pieces". He spent time in London (1789–1791), studied in Paris (at the Académie des Beaux-Arts de l'Institut de France in 1791), and traveled to paint in  Italy, Switzerland and Germany.

References

1769 births
1819 deaths
19th-century Dutch painters
Dutch male painters
Painters from Middelburg
19th-century Dutch male artists